The Lunan Water is an easterly flowing river in Angus, Scotland, that discharges to the North Sea  north of the town of Arbroath. Draining chiefly agricultural lands, this stream has a moderate level of turbidity and a pH level of approximately 8.7.  Other nearby watercourses discharging to the North Sea include River North Esk and River South Esk, both to the north. At its mouth the Lunan Water meets the North Sea at the hamlet of Lunan, upon Lunan Bay.  The beach at Lunan Bay was voted the "best beach in Scotland" in a survey conducted in the year 2000. The 15th-century ruins of Red Castle are located at the river mouth, close to Lunan.

See also
Stone of Morphie

References

Rivers of Angus, Scotland